Mauro Diego de Tovar y Valle Maldonado, O.S.B. or Marcos de Tovar y Valle Maldonado (1586 – 22 October 1666) was a Roman Catholic prelate who served as Bishop of Chiapas (1652–1656), and Bishop of Caracas (1639–1652).

Early life 
Mauro Diego de Tovar y Valle Maldonado was born in Villacastín, Spain and ordained a priest in the Order of St. Benedict on 13 March 1600. On 3 October 1639, he was selected by the King of Spain and confirmed by Pope Urban VIII as Bishop of Caracas.

On 18 December 1639, he was consecrated bishop by Juan Alonso y Ocón, Bishop of Yucatán with Miguel Avellán, Auxiliary Bishop of Toledo, and Timoteo Pérez Vargas, Bishop of Ispahan, as co-consecrators. On 16 December 1652, he was appointed by Pope Innocent X as Bishop of Chiapas where he served until his death on 22 October 1666.

Episcopal succession
While bishop, he was the principal consecrator of:
Hernando de Lobo Castrillo, Bishop of Puerto Rico (1650); 
and the principal co-consecrator of:
Juan de Palafox y Mendoza, Bishop of Tlaxcala (1639); and 
Francisco Diego Díaz de Quintanilla y de Hevía y Valdés, Bishop of Durango (1640).

References

External links and additional sources
 (for Chronology of Bishops) 
 (for Chronology of Bishops) 
 (for Chronology of Bishops) 
 (for Chronology of Bishops)  

1586 births
1666 deaths
17th-century Roman Catholic bishops in Venezuela
Bishops appointed by Pope Urban VIII
Bishops appointed by Pope Innocent X
Benedictine bishops
17th-century Roman Catholic bishops in Mexico
Roman Catholic bishops of Caracas